Remy Kenneth Bonjasky (born January 10, 1976) is a Surinamese-Dutch former kickboxer. He is a three-time K-1 World Grand Prix heavyweight champion, winning the title in 2003, 2004, and 2008. Bonjasky has been known for his flying kicks, knee attacks and strong defense, hence the nickname "The Flying Gentleman".

Background
Bonjasky was born in Paramaribo, Suriname and moved to the Netherlands when he was 5 years old. Bonjasky was involved in football during his teens, but quit after breaking his leg. At the age of 18, when a friend brought him to the Mejiro Kickboxing Gym to "see who is the best", Bonjasky decided to stay and train and eventually fell in love with kickboxing. After graduating from university, Bonjasky worked as a banker at ABN Amro for a time.

Kickboxing

Early K-1 career, World GP wins in 2003 and 2004
Bonjasky had his first fight at the age of 19 against Valentijn Overeem. Bonjasky won by TKO. From this moment on he quit his job as a network operator and focused on training full-time. Despite losing his first K-1 fight by split decision he made his second fight against an established K-1 fighter, Ray Sefo, winning by TKO.

Bonjasky lost against K-1 and kickboxing superstar Stefan Leko in 2002.

On December 6, 2003 at the K-1 World Grand Prix 2003 quarter-finals in Tokyo, Japan, Bonjasky was matched up against Australian fighter Peter "The Chief" Graham. Remy won the fight by a TKO in the first round. In semi-finals Cyril Abidi fell victim of The Flying Gentleman's flying knee attacks, and after defeating Musashi in the tournament finals by unanimous decision Bonjasky was crowned the K-1 World champion.

In 2004 he accumulated wins over Tsuyoshi Nakasako, Francois Botha, Aziz Khattou and ex-sumo champion Chad "Akebono" Rowan. If it hadn't been for his one loss in 2004 against Francisco Filho he would have beaten Semmy Schilt's record of the longest winning streak in K-1 history.

On December 4, 2004 at the K-1 World Grand Prix 2004, with three decision wins over Ernesto Hoost, Francois Botha and Musashi, Bonjasky successfully defended his K-1 WGP title.

He presented himself on November 19, 2005 for the K-1 World Grand Prix 2005 finals in Tokyo, to keep his title for a third consecutive year, but was stopped by Semmy Schilt's knee strikes in the tournament's semi-finals.

2006-2007: Feud with Leko, World GP misfortunes

In 2006, after his divorce and change of trainers, he came back to the K-1 World Grand Prix 2006 finals. In his quarter-final match, he got a rematch against former foe Stefan Leko, who'd beaten him in 2002, and it turned into a grudge match. When Bonjasky was champion, Leko was taking a hiatus away from K-1, and his career rise had thus stalled. Prior to his rematch with Remy, he pledged that the 2006 Grand Prix would be his year to finally become the undisputed champion, at the expense of Bonjasky whom he'd beaten before. Bonjasky stated that Leko was 'limited'. In the fight, Bonjasky got hit in the groin twice in the first round and the fight was postponed for 30 minutes. When the bout resumed, Bonjasky still managed to win the fight by a unanimous decision, after scoring a knockdown in the final minute of the fight. However, because of a persisting injury to the groin, he was not able to continue the tournament and was replaced by Peter Aerts.

In 2007 Bonjasky's mother died. Because Remy was badly hurt by this he pulled out of scheduled fights with Badr Hari and Peter Aerts. His only fight before the Final 16 was against Glaube Feitosa in Hawaii. Remy won by decision and remained open for the Final 16 event.

On September 29, 2007 Bonjasky was booked in a rubber match with Stefan Leko at the K-1 World GP 2007 in Seoul Final 16 event. The pair went in with bad blood, as Remy claimed that simply hearing the name of Leko 'made his blood boil' after their second fight, and he claimed that the groin shots he delivered were deliberate. He further lit the fuse by claiming Leko was a limited fighter, who 'only had a couple of punches and a spinning back kick, nothing else'. Leko for his part said he would be glad to prove once and for all that he was the superior fighter, which he claimed was clear from their first fight, and that Remy was 'an actor', and had been 'lucky' the second fight, and had 'the heart of a chicken'.

Bonjasky won the grudge fight by TKO when the ref stopped it in the first round after landing his trademark flying knee strike. Leko beat the count, but the referee waved off the bout. Some have criticised the stoppage as K-1 protecting the by-then bigger name superstar, as Remy had been their World Grand Prix champion, and that K-1 wanted him through to the later stages. Others said that Leko did not display that he still had his faculties. Regardless, the fight marked the end (as of 2011) of the feud between the two, and the win qualified Bonjasky for the K-1 World Grand Prix 2007 Finals which were held on December 8, 2007 at the Yokohama Arena in Japan.

At the K-1 World Grand Prix 2007 Finals, Remy Bonjasky faced fellow Dutch  fighter Badr Hari. He won the fight by decision. In the semi-finals he faced Dutch legend Peter Aerts, losing to Aerts in a unanimous decision.

Return to the top, World GP 2008 champion, later career
Bonjasky started off 2008 by knocking out Melvin Manhoef in Amsterdam, Bazigit Atajev in Tapei and majority decision over Paul Slowinski in the K-1 16 to qualify for his 6th Grand Prix appearance.

In the quarter finals he defeated Jerome Lebanner by TKO, Gokhan Saki by KO in the semi-finals, sending him to the K-1 World Grand Prix Finals for the third time against Badr Hari. After a slow start he knocked Hari down with a left hook and then went on defensive for the rest of the round. Remy was hit after the bell at the end of the round by an angry Hari. In the second round Hari took Remy to ground, then punched him twice and then gave an unsportsmanlike foot stomp to Remy when he was down. Remy seemed unable to get up and was inspected by the ringside doctors. Meanwhile, Hari screamed at Remy, telling him to get up and quarrelled with his trainer, Ivan Hippolyte. After 5 minutes the doctors announced Remy had double vision and could not continue. Hari was therefore disqualified and Bonjasky was declared the K-1 World Grand Prix 2008 Champion. Remy was disappointed by the outcome, evident from his unhappy expression after the decision was announced.

Bonjasky stated in a post-fight interview that he still had double vision and a headache the next morning. Hari however claimed that "Remy was acting", and that, "his corner was screaming at him to stay down".

After he won his 3rd GP title, he faced Alistair Overeem. Overeem was aggressive in the 1st and dominant in the 2nd round, knocking Bonjasky down in the end of the 2nd round with a right cross, but referee Nobuaki Kakuda did not count it. In the 3rd round Remy knocked Alistair down with a flying knee and right punch combo to secure a unanimous decision win. All three judges scored the bout 30-28. It was later confirmed that Remy had badly twisted his left knee 2 days before the fight (reason for his inactivity). Remy went on medical recovery after the fight and did not fight again for months.

Remy returned to training to train for the K-1 World Grand Prix 2009 Final 16. At the event he defeated Melvin Manhoef, for the third time, by unanimous decision.

At the K-1 World Grand Prix 2009 Final Remy was won his third consecutive unanimous decision against Errol Zimmerman. In the Semi Finals he met his nemesis Semmy Schilt. In the first round Remy landed a left hook to knock Semmy down. Semmy however landed a low kick to Remy's left leg that was damaged in his earlier fight with Zimmerman, Remy was therefore knocked out of the tournament, losing to Semmy for the third time.

Bonjasky was absent from the K-1 World Grand Prix 2010 in Yokohama tournament, and did not fight at all in 2010, and has pondered retirement after having eye surgery in August of the year. He opened his own kickboxing / muaythai gym, Bonjasky Academy, in the city of Almere in that year.

Comeback
After three years out of the ring due to an eye injury, Bonjasky faced Anderson "Braddock" Silva at Glory 2: Brussels on October 6, 2012 in Brussels, Belgium. After a close three rounds, the bout was called a draw and went into an extension round. Silva faded and allowed Bonjasky to get the better of him, coming out as the majority decision winner.

He competed in the sixteen-man 2012 Glory Heavyweight Grand Slam at Glory 4: Tokyo - 2012 Heavyweight Grand Slam in Saitama, Japan on December 31, 2012. At the opening stage, he defeated Filip Verlinden by unanimous decision, taking rounds one and three. He was then eliminated in the quarter-finals, however, when he looked lackluster against newcomer Jamal Ben Saddik and, due to the "best of three" format in the tournament, lost on points after two rounds.

He faced Tyrone Spong at Glory 5: London in London, England on March 23, 2013. Bonjasky lost in the second round via KO from a right hook.

He lost to Anderson Silva by unanimous decision in a rematch at Glory 13: Tokyo - Welterweight World Championship Tournament in Tokyo, Japan on December 21, 2013.

He defeated Mirko Cro Cop by majority decision in a rematch at Glory 14: Zagreb in Zagreb, Croatia on March 8, 2014. The fight would be his last as he announced his retirement at a pre-fight press conference in the days leading up to the bout.

In July 2017, he announced another comeback via Instagram, stating that he signed a contract with Glory kickboxing. Later that year it was announced that he would face Melvin Manhoef for the fourth time. The fight was not promoted by Glory but instead World Fighting League, a promotion founded by Melvin Manhoef, promoted the fight. The bout took place in Almere, Netherlands on October 29, 2017. Bonjasky lost the bout by decision. After the bout he announced his retirement.

Outside the ring
Aside from the sport, Bonjasky has worked as a banker, network administrator, and model. One of his latest modeling acts is to be the face for the men's line of Dutch lingerie brand Sapph. He has worked for the brand since 2010 along with former swimmer Inge de Bruijn, the face for the women's line of the brand.

In early 2011 Bonjasky appeared on Season 4 of the Sterren Dansen op het IJs show, the Dutch version of Skating with Celebrities (Dancing on Ice), performing a figure skating routine with his Sapph fellow Inge de Bruijn. It has been expected since then that he will become a TV presenter.

Medal of honor
Bonjasky has been awarded two medals of honor since 2007.

Near the end of July 2007 in Amsterdam, he helped Dutch police in the arrest of two British criminals. The two men had shot darts at passers-by with a rifle while they were on the move in a van. Bonjasky was their last victim, and after having been hit by the dart he pursued the van in a cab and proceeded to call the police who managed to arrest the criminals. Following the arrest, Bonjasky received a medal from the Amsterdam Police Department for this courageous and honorable act.

In 2009 he was awarded the medal of honor by the city of Almere, becoming an honorary citizen of the city, after being chosen by the city's politician Arno Visser, for his accomplishments in the sport.

Bonjasky Academy
Remy Bonjasky's own gym, a kickboxing gym named "Bonjasky Academy", officially opened on September 6, 2010 in Almere. The opening ceremony was attended by two TV presenters and four athletes, Quinty Trustfull, Humberto Tan, Kew Jaliens, Peter Aerts, Jerome Le Banner, and Ernesto Hoost.

Championships and accomplishments

Kickboxing 
Battle of Arnhem
Battle of Arnhem I Tournament Champion

Black Belt Magazine
2009 Full-Contact Fighter of the Year 

International Professional Muay Thai Federation
IPMTF European Super Heavyweight Championship (One time)

K-1
2003 K-1 World Grand Prix in Las Vegas II Champion
2003 K-1 World Grand Prix Champion
2004 K-1 World Grand Prix Champion
2008 K-1 World Grand Prix Champion

KO Power Tournament
1998 KO Power Tournament Runner-up

World Pan Amateur Kickboxing Association
WPKA World Super Heavyweight Muay Thai Championship (One time)

Kickboxing record (incomplete)

|-  style="background:#fbb;"
| 2017-10-29 || Loss ||align=left| Melvin Manhoef || WFL: Manhoef vs. Bonjasky, Final 16  || Almere, Netherlands || Decision || 3 || 3:00
|-
|-  style="background:#cfc;"
| 2014-03-08 || Win ||align=left| Mirko Filipovic || Glory 14: Zagreb || Zagreb, Croatia || Decision (majority) || 3 || 3:00
|-  style="background:#fbb;"
| 2013-12-21 || Loss ||align=left| Anderson Silva || Glory 13: Tokyo || Tokyo, Japan || Decision (unanimous) || 3 || 3:00
|-  style="background:#fbb;"
| 2013-03-23 || Loss ||align=left| Tyrone Spong || Glory 5: London || London, England || KO (right hook) || 2 || 2:02 
|-  style="background:#fbb;"
| 2012-12-31 || Loss ||align=left| Jamal Ben Saddik || Glory 4: Tokyo - Heavyweight Grand Slam Tournament, Quarter Finals || Saitama, Japan || Decision (unanimous) || 2 || 2:00  
|-  style="background:#cfc;"
| 2012-12-31 || Win ||align=left| Filip Verlinden || Glory 4: Tokyo - Heavyweight Grand Slam Tournament, First Round || Saitama, Japan || Decision (unanimous) || 3 || 2:00 
|-  style="background:#cfc;"
| 2012-10-06 || Win || align=left| Anderson Silva || Glory 2: Brussels || Brussels, Belgium || Decision (majority) || 4 || 3:00
|-  style="background:#fbb;"
| 2009-12-05 || Loss ||align=left| Semmy Schilt || K-1 World Grand Prix 2009 Final, Semi Finals || Yokohama, Japan || KO (right low kick) || 1 || 2:38
|-  style="background:#cfc;"
| 2009-12-05 || Win ||align=left| Errol Zimmerman || K-1 World Grand Prix 2009 Final, Quarter Finals || Yokohama, Japan || Decision (unanimous) || 3 || 3:00
|-  style="background:#cfc;"
| 2009-09-26 || Win ||align=left| Melvin Manhoef || K-1 World Grand Prix 2009 Final 16 || Seoul, Korea || Decision (unanimous) || 3 || 3:00
|-
! style=background:white colspan=9 |
|-  style="background:#cfc;"
| 2009-03-28 || Win ||align=left| Alistair Overeem || K-1 World GP 2009 in Yokohama || Yokohama, Japan || Decision (unanimous) || 3 || 3:00
|-  style="background:#cfc;"
| 2008-12-06 || Win ||align=left| Badr Hari || K-1 World GP 2008 Final, Final || Yokohama, Japan || DQ (illegal kick) || 2 || 0:53
|-
! style=background:white colspan=9 |
|-  style="background:#cfc;"
| 2008-12-06 || Win ||align=left| Gokhan Saki || K-1 World GP 2008 Final, Semi Finals || Yokohama, Japan || KO (jumping mid-kick)|| 2 || 0:53
|-  style="background:#cfc;"
| 2008-12-06 || Win ||align=left| Jérôme Le Banner || K-1 World GP 2008 Final, Quarter Finals || Yokohama, Japan || TKO (arm injury)|| 3 || 1:46
|-  style="background:#cfc;"
| 2008-09-27 || Win ||align=left| Paul Slowinski || K-1 World GP 2008 Final 16 || Seoul, Korea || Decision (majority) || 3 || 3:00
|-
! style=background:white colspan=9 |
|-  style="background:#cfc;"
| 2008-07-13 || Win ||align=left| Bazigit Atajev || K-1 World GP 2008 in Taipei || Taipei City, Taiwan || KO (jumping knee strike) || 3 || 2:17
|-  style="background:#cfc;"
| 2008-04-26 || Win ||align=left| Melvin Manhoef || K-1 World GP 2008 in Amsterdam || Amsterdam, Netherlands || KO (flying high kick) || 3 || 1:55
|-  style="background:#fbb;"
| 2007-12-08 || Loss ||align=left| Peter Aerts || K-1 World GP 2007 Final, Semi Finals || Yokohama, Japan || Decision (unanimous) || 3 || 3:00
|-  style="background:#cfc;"
| 2007-12-08 || Win ||align=left| Badr Hari || K-1 World GP 2007 Final, Quarter Finals || Yokohama, Japan || Decision (majority) || 3 || 3:00
|-  style="background:#cfc;"
| 2007-09-29 || Win ||align=left| Stefan Leko || K-1 World GP 2007 in Seoul Final 16 || Seoul, Korea || TKO (referee stoppage) || 1 || 2:50
|-
! style=background:white colspan=9 |
|-  style="background:#cfc;"
| 2007-04-28 || Win ||align=left| Glaube Feitosa || K-1 World GP 2007 in Hawaii || Honolulu, HI || Decision (majority) || 3 || 3:00
|-  style="background:#cfc;"
| 2006-12-02 || Win ||align=left| Stefan Leko || K-1 World Grand Prix 2006, Quarter Finals || Tokyo, Japan || Decision (unanimous) || 3 || 3:00
|-
! style=background:white colspan=9 |
|-  style="background:#cfc;"
| 2006-09-30 || Win ||align=left| Gary Goodridge || K-1 World Grand Prix 2006 in Osaka Opening Round || Osaka, Japan || KO (knee strike) || 3 || 0:52
|-
! style=background:white colspan=9 |
|-  style="background:#cfc;"
| 2006-07-30 || Win ||align=left| Mighty Mo || K-1 World Grand Prix 2006 in Sapporo || Sapporo, Japan || Decision (unanimous) || 3 || 3:00
|-  style="background:#fbb;"
| 2006-05-13 || Loss ||align=left| Jérôme Le Banner || K-1 World Grand Prix 2006 in Amsterdam || Amsterdam, Netherlands || Decision (appeal)|| 3 || 3:00
|-  style="background:#cfc;"
| 2005-12-31 || Win ||align=left| Sylvester Terkay || K-1 PREMIUM 2005 Dynamite!! || Tokyo, Japan || Decision (majority) || 3 || 3:00
|-  style="background:#fbb;"
| 2005-11-19 || Loss ||align=left| Semmy Schilt || K-1 World Grand Prix 2005 || Tokyo, Japan || KO (knee strike) || 1 || 2:08
|-  style="background:#cfc;"
| 2005-11-19 || Win ||align=left| Choi Hong-man || K-1 World Grand Prix 2005, Quarter Finals || Tokyo, Japan || Decision (unanimous) || 3 || 3:00
|-  style="background:#cfc;"
| 2005-09-23 || Win ||align=left| Alexey Ignashov || K-1 World Grand Prix 2005 in Osaka - Final Elimination, Super Fight || Osaka, Japan || Decision (Ext. R) || 4 || 3:00
|-  style="background:#cfc;"
| 2005-05-21 || Win ||align=left| Rickard Nordstrand || K-1 Scandinavia Grand Prix 2005 || Stockholm, Sweden || Decision (unanimous) || 3 || 3:00
|-  style="background:#fbb;"
| 2005-04-30 || Loss ||align=left| Mighty Mo || K-1 World Grand Prix 2005 in Las Vegas || Las Vegas, NV || Decision (split) || 3 || 3:00
|-  style="background:#cfc;"
| 2005-03-19 || Win ||align=left| Ray Mercer || K-1 World Grand Prix 2005 in Seoul || Seoul, Korea || TKO (right high kick) || 1 || 0:22
|-  style="background:#cfc;"
| 2004-12-04 || Win ||align=left| Musashi || K-1 World Grand Prix 2004, Final || Tokyo, Japan || Decision (2 Ext. R) || 5 || 3:00
|-
! style=background:white colspan=9 |
|-  style="background:#cfc;"
| 2004-12-04 || Win ||align=left| Francois Botha || K-1 World Grand Prix 2004, Semi Finals || Tokyo, Japan || Decision (unanimous) || 3 || 3:00
|-  style="background:#cfc;"
| 2004-12-04 || Win ||align=left| Ernesto Hoost || K-1 World Grand Prix 2004, Quarter Finals || Tokyo, Japan || Decision (Ext. R) || 4 || 3:00
|-  style="background:#cfc;"
| 2004-09-25 || Win ||align=left| Akebono || K-1 World Grand Prix 2004 Final Elimination, Super Fight || Tokyo, Japan || KO (right high kick) || 3 || 0:33
|-  style="background:#cfc;"
| 2004-07-17 || Win ||align=left| Aziz Khattou || K-1 World Grand Prix 2004 in Seoul || Seoul, Korea || TKO (arm injury) || 2 || 1:59
|-  style="background:#cfc;"
| 2004-06-06 || Win ||align=left| Francois Botha || K-1 World Grand Prix 2004 in Nagoya || Nagoya, Japan || Decision (unanimous) || 3 || 3:00
|-  style="background:#fbb;"
| 2004-05-30 || Loss ||align=left| Francisco Filho || Kyokushin vs K-1 2004 All Out Battle || Japan || Decision (unanimous) || 3 || 3:00
|-  style="background:#cfc;"
| 2004-02-15 || Win ||align=left| Tsuyoshi Nakasako || K-1 Burning 2004 || Okinawa, Japan || KO (left high kick)|| 3 || 2:54
|-  style="background:#cfc;"
| 2003-12-06 || Win ||align=left| Musashi || K-1 World Grand Prix 2003, Final || Tokyo, Japan || Decision (unanimous) || 3 || 3:00
|-
! style=background:white colspan=9 |
|-  style="background:#cfc;"
| 2003-12-06 || Win ||align=left| Cyril Abidi || K-1 World Grand Prix 2003, Semi Finals || Tokyo, Japan, Semi Final || KO (flying knee strike) || 1 || 1:46
|-  style="background:#cfc;"
| 2003-12-06 || Win ||align=left| Peter Graham || K-1 World Grand Prix 2003, Quarter Finals || Tokyo, Japan || TKO (referee stoppage) || 1 || 2:58
|-  style="background:#cfc;"
| 2003-10-11 || Win ||align=left| Bob Sapp || K-1 World Grand Prix 2003 Final Elimination || Osaka, Japan || DQ (punch on the ground) || 2 || 1:20
|-
! style=background:white colspan=9 |
|-  style="background:#cfc;"
| 2003-08-15 || Win ||align=left| Michael McDonald || K-1 World Grand Prix 2003 in Las Vegas II, Final || Las Vegas, NV || Decision (Ext. R) || 4 || 3:00
|-
! style=background:white colspan=9 |
|-  style="background:#cfc;"
| 2003-08-15 || Win ||align=left| Jeff Ford || K-1 World Grand Prix 2003 in Las Vegas II, Semi Finals || Las Vegas, NV || TKO (shoulder injury) || 1 || 1:28
|-  style="background:#cfc;"
| 2003-08-15 || Win ||align=left| Vernon White || K-1 World Grand Prix 2003 in Las Vegas II, Quarter Finals || Las Vegas, NV || KO (flying high kick) || 1 || 1:55
|-  style="background:#fbb;"
| 2003-07-13 || Loss ||align=left| Semmy Schilt || K-1 World Grand Prix 2003 in Fukuoka || Fukuoka, Japan || Decision (unanimous) || 5 || 3:00
|-  style="background:#cfc;"
| 2003-03-30 || Win ||align=left| Bjorn Bregy || K-1 World Grand Prix 2003 in Saitama || Saitama, Japan || TKO (corner stoppage) || 3 || 1:29
|-  style="background:#cfc;"
| 2002-09-29 || Win ||align=left| Antoni Hardonk || It's Showtime – As Usual / Battle Time || Haarlem, Netherlands || Decision (unanimous) || 5 || 3:00
|-  style="background:#fbb;"
| 2002-08-17 || Loss ||align=left| Stefan Leko || K-1 World Grand Prix 2002 in Las Vegas || Las Vegas, NV || Decision (unanimous) || 3 || 3:00
|-
! style=background:white colspan=9 |
|-  style="background:#fbb;"
| 2002-07-14 || Loss ||align=left| Mirko Filipovic || K-1 World Grand Prix 2002 in Fukuoka || Fukuoka, Japan || TKO (high kick and punches)|| 2 || 2:06
|-  style="background:#cfc;"
| 2002-05-25 || Win ||align=left| Petar Majstorović || K-1 World Grand Prix 2002 in Paris || Paris, France || KO (right high kick) || 4 || 0:27
|-  style="background:#fbb;"
| 2002-02-24 || Loss ||align=left| Errol Parris || K-1 World Grand Prix 2002 Preliminary Netherlands, Semi Finals || Arnhem, Netherlands || KO (left body shot) || 1 || 1:20
|-  style="background:#cfc;"
| 2002-02-24 || Win ||align=left| Melvin Manhoef || K-1 World Grand Prix 2002 Preliminary Netherlands, Quarter Finals || Arnhem, Netherlands || Decision (unanimous) || 3 || 3:00
|-  style="background:#cfc;"
| 2002-01-25 || Win ||align=left| Sergei Arhipov || K-1 World Grand Prix 2002 Preliminary Marseilles || Marseilles, France || TKO (corner stoppage) || 5 || 2:00
|-  style="background:#cfc;"
| 2001-06-24 || Win ||align=left| Ray Sefo || K-1 Survival 2001 || Sendai, Japan || TKO (corner stoppage) || 4 || 2:00
|-  style="background:#fbb;"
| 2001-02-04 || Loss ||align=left| Jerrel Venetiaan || K-1 Holland GP 2001 in Arnhem, Quarter Finals || Arnhem, Netherlands || Decision (split) || 3 || 3:00
|-  style="background:#cfc;"
| 2000-12-12 || Win ||align=left| Peter Varga || It's Showtime - Christmas Edition || Haarlem, Netherlands || KO (jumping knee strike) || 1 || 2:57
|-  style="background:#fbb;"
| 2000-10-22 || Loss ||align=left| Jerrel Venetiaan || It's Showtime - Exclusive || Haarlem, Netherlands || Decision (unanimous) || 5 || 3:00
|-  style="background:#cfc;"
| 2000-09-03 || Win ||align=left| Attila Karacs || Battle of Arnhem II || Arnhem, Netherlands || KO || 1 || N/A
|-  style="background:#cfc;"
| 2000-05-20 || Win ||align=left| Stanislav Bahchevanov || Thaiboxing - Thrill of the Year! || Amsterdam, Netherlands || KO || 2 || N/A
|-  style="background:#fbb;"
| 2000-03-13 || Loss ||align=left| Sergei Arhipov || Night Club "Reaktor" || Minsk, Belarus || Decision || 5 || 3:00
|-  style="background:#cfc;"
| 1999-10-24 || Win ||align=left| Ayhan Ozcelik || It's Showtime - It's Showtime || Haarlem, Netherlands || TKO || 2 || N/A
|-  style="background:#cfc;"
| 1999-09-05 || Win ||align=left| Peter Verchuren || Battle of Arnhem I || Arnhem, Netherlands || KO || 1 || N/A
|-
! style=background:white colspan=9 |
|-  style="background:#cfc;"
| 1999-09-05 || Win ||align=left| Frank Otto || Battle of Arnhem I || Arnhem, Netherlands || TKO || 1 || N/A
|-  style="background:#cfc;"
| 1999-06-06 || Win ||align=left| Rani Berbachi || N/A || Netherlands || KO || 2 || N/A
|-
! style=background:white colspan=9 |
|-  style="background:#fbb;"
| 1998-04-26 || Loss ||align=left| Alexey Ignashov || WPKL Muay Thai Fight Night || Netherlands || Decision (unanimous) || 3 || 2:00
|-  style="background:#fbb;"
| 1998-04-14 || Loss ||align=left| Lloyd van Dams || KO Power Tournament || Netherlands || Decision || 3 || 3:00
|-  style="background:#cfc;"
| 1998-04-14 || Win ||align=left| Peter Verchuren || KO Power Tournament || Netherlands || Decision || 3 || 3:00
|-  style="background:#fbb;"
| 1997-10 || Loss ||align=left| Achille Roger || Kickboxing Tournament Prague 1997 Semi Finals || Prague, Czech Republic || Decision || 4 || 2:00
|-  style="background:#cfc;"
| 1997-10 || Win ||align=left|Pavel Majer || Kickboxing Tournament Prague 1997 Quarter Finals || Prague, Czech Republic || Decision || 4 || 2:00
|-  style="background:#cfc;"
| 1995 || Win ||align=left| Valentijn Overeem || Vini Vidi Vici || Netherlands || TKO (corner stoppage)|| 2 || N/A 
|-
| colspan=9 | Legend:

References

External links

Remy Bonjasky's official website

1976 births
Living people
Dutch male kickboxers
Dutch Muay Thai practitioners
Heavyweight kickboxers
Sportspeople from Paramaribo
Surinamese emigrants to the Netherlands
Surinamese male kickboxers
Surinamese Muay Thai practitioners